Fanuel Jariretundu Kozonguizi (26 January 1932 - 1 February 1995) was a Namibian lawyer and politician. He served as permanent petitioner to the United Nations on the issue of Namibian independence, and was a high-ranking administrator in South-West Africa prior to Namibian independence, both under South African administration and in the Transitional Government. In independent Namibia he was a member of Parliament and ombudsman. Kozonguizi was a founding  member and first president of the South West African National Union.

Biography
Kozonguizi was born in January 1932 in Windhoek Namibia and grew up in Warmbad in South Africa where he completed high school. He eventually earned his matric in 1953 and studied at Fort Hare, and Rhodes and University of Cape Town. He became a barrister and Inner Temple member in London in 1970.

In 1954 he began his career as an activist in Namibia, working to support contract labourers returning to Ovamboland. In that year he, Mburumba Kerina, Zedekia Ngavirue formed the South West Africa Students Organization at Fort Hare University. In 1956, Kozonguizi spoke before the United Nations on the issue of South West Africa along with Reverend Michael Scott, Mburumba Kerina, Hans Beukes, Markus Kooper, Sam Nujoma, Ismael Fortune, Jacob Kuhangua and Hosea Kutako. In 1958 he succeeded Reverend Scott as Herero Chief's Council's permanent petitioner to the UN.

In 1959, he was elected the first President of SWANU, which was the first political party in Namibian history. He lasted as SWANU's leader until 1966, when Kozonguizi stressed an ideologically pure commitment to socialism and anti-imperialism which made SWANU unpopular to some in comparison to the other major political party and liberation movement, the South West Africa People's Organization (SWAPO). This also led to the 1968 derecognition of SWANU by the Organization of African Unity.

After serving as a lawyer in London for a short time, Kozonguizi returned to Namibia in 1976 as legal advisor to Clemens Kapuuo and the OvaHerero delegation at the Turnhalle Constitutional Conference becoming an advocate in the process. He subsequently joined Kapuuo as member of the Democratic Turnhalle Alliance (DTA). He was appointed into a position at the Office of the Administrator-General in 1980, becoming "the highest-ranking black Namibian in the colonial government."

From 1980 until independence, Kozonguizi served in the transitional government of Namibia in various positions, including as the Minister of Justice, Information, Post and Telecommunication from June 1985 to 1988, and as Minister of Information from 1988 to 1989. Kozonguizi joined the National Unity Democratic Organisation (NUDO), a party that was part of the DTA at that time. Upon independence in 1990, he was elected into the 1st National Assembly of Namibia on a DTA ticket. He served as national ombudsman until his death in February 1995 at the age of 63.

References

Notes

Literature

Further reading
 Matthew ǁGoaseb (2007) Triumph of courage: Profiles of Namibian political heroes and heroines. Legacy Publications, Windhoek

1932 births
1995 deaths
Politicians from Windhoek
SWANU politicians
Members of the National Assembly (Namibia)
Namibian socialists